The South Fork Feather River is a Lake Oroville tributary in the south portion of the Middle Fork Feather Watershed which drains several reservoirs including Little Grass Valley Reservoir.

See also
List of rivers of California

References

Tributaries of the Feather River
Rivers of Plumas County, California
Rivers of Northern California